Hillhouse is an unincorporated community located in Coahoma County, Mississippi, United States. Hillhouse is located on the former Yazoo and Mississippi Valley Railroad and was once home to three general stores. A post office operated under the name Hillhouse from 1890 to 1972.

Notable person
 Sonelius Smith, jazz pianist

References

Unincorporated communities in Coahoma County, Mississippi
Unincorporated communities in Mississippi